Alison may refer to:

People
 Alison (given name), including a list of people with the name
 Alison (surname)

Music
 Alison (album), aka Excuse Me, a 1975 album by Australian singer Alison MacCallum
 "Alison" (song), song by Elvis Costello
 "Alison (C'est ma copine à moi)", a 1993 single by Jordy
 "Alison", 1994 single by Slowdive

Places
 Alison, New South Wales, suburb of the Central Coast region in NSW, Australia
 Alison Sound, an inlet on the Central Coast of British Columbia, Canada
 Point Alison, Alberta, a summer village in Alberta, Canada

Other uses
 Alison (film), a South African documentary film
 Alison (company), an Irish educational technology company
 Alison, common name for plants of the genus Alyssum, including:
 Sweet alison, a decorative plant
 Alison (katydid) a genus in the Hexacentrinae subfamily of bush crickets

See also
 Alisoun (disambiguation)
 Alisson (disambiguation)
 Allison (disambiguation)
 Allisson (disambiguation)
 Allie